The Navy Board (formerly known as the Council of the Marine or Council of the Marine Causes) was the commission responsible for the day-to-day civil administration of the Royal Navy between 1546 and 1832. The board was headquartered within the Navy Office.

History
The origins of the Navy Board can be traced back to the 13th century via the office Keeper of the King's Ports and Galleys; later known as the Clerk of the King's Ships. The management of the navy expanded with the Keeper of the Storehouses appointed in 1514 and the Clerk Comptroller in 1522. The Lieutenant of the Admiralty, Treasurer of Marine Causes and Surveyor and Rigger of the Navy were all added in 1544, and a seventh officer, the Master of Naval Ordnance a year later.  By January 1545 this group was already working as a body known as the Council of the Marine or King's Majesty's Council of His Marine. 

In the first quarter of 1545 an official memorandum proposed the establishment of a new organisation that would formalize a structure for administering the navy with a clear chain of command. The Navy Board was officially appointed to this role by letters patent of Henry VIII on the 24 April 1546. It was directed by the Lieutenant of the Admiralty until 1557. The board was charged with overseeing the administrative affairs of the navy; directive, executive and operational duties of the Lord High Admiral remained with the Admiralty and Marine Affairs Office. 

In 1557 the Lieutenant of the Admiralty ceased to direct the Navy Board and that role was given to the Treasurer of the Navy also known as the Senior Commissioner. The Navy Board remained independent until 1628, when it became a subsidiary body of the Board of Admiralty now reporting to the First Lord of the Admiralty. In 1660 the Treasurer of the Navy ceased to direct the board and was replaced by the Comptroller who now held the new joint title of Chairman of the Board. 

In 1832, following proposals by Sir James Graham to restructure the Naval Service, the Navy Board was abolished (along with its subsidiary boards for Sick and Hurt, Transport, and Victualling). Operational functions were taken over by the Board of Admiralty and administrative functions were dispersed between the Naval Lords.

Duties and responsibilities

The Navy Board's responsibilities included:

 the construction and maintenance of ships through the Royal Dockyards of Deptford, Woolwich, Portsmouth and Chatham as well as the operations of these dockyards and other naval establishments. 
 the procurement of victuals (obtained from private contractors or "agents"), stores, supplies and services for the fleet and provision of ordnance items (sourced from the Office of Ordnance). 
 civilian and naval pay. 
 the appointment of junior officers and warrant officers. 

Individual officials held responsibility as follows:
 The Lieutenant of the Admiralty initially presided over the Council of the Marine (1545–1564) but was later superseded by the treasurer.
 The Treasurer of the Navy was senior commissioner of the board from 1564 to 1660 and controlled and directed all Naval finance – though in practice his responsibilities were later increasingly devolved to the Comptroller.
 The Comptroller of the Navy was in charge of Naval spending and also acted as chairman of the board from 1660 until its abolition in 1832.
 The Surveyor of the Navy was in charge of Naval shipbuilding, ship design and running the Royal Dockyards.
 The Clerk of the Navy was in charge of the day-to-day running of the board and the administration of its work and acted as chief secretary to the Navy Office.
 The Surveyor of Marine Victuals was responsible for the administration of victualling yards and supply of food and beverages for the Royal Navy from 1550 to 1679. This office was abolished and replaced by the Victualling Board in 1683.
 The Master of Naval Ordnance was a specifically assigned officer from the Ordnance Office responsible for the supply of Naval Ordnance and was briefly a member from 1561 to 1569.
 The Comptroller of Storekeepers's Accounts, The Comptroller of Treasurer's Accounts and The Comptroller of Victualling Accounts were posts created to relieve the Comptroller of the Navy of these duties.

Note: The Navy Pay Office (domain of the Treasurer of the Navy) was independent of the Board; though the Board's Commissioners were required to authorize payments, all funds were held and issued by the Pay Office (which was also known as the Navy Treasury).

Subsidiary boards
As the size of the fleet grew, the Admiralty sought to focus the activity of the Navy Board on two areas: ships and their maintenance, and naval expenditure. Therefore, from the mid- to late-17th century, a number of subsidiary Boards were established to oversee other aspects of the board's work. These included:

 The Victualling Board (1683–1832). Responsible for providing naval personnel with food, drink and supplies.
 The Sick and Hurt Board (established temporarily in times of war from 1653, placed on a permanent footing from 1715, amalgamated into the Transport Board from 1806). Responsible for providing medical support services to the navy and managing prisoners of war.
 The Transport Board (1690–1724, re-established 1794, amalgamated into the Victualling Board in 1817). Responsible for the provision of transport services and for the transportation of supplies and military equipment.

Each of these subsidiary Boards went on to gain a degree of independence (though they remained, nominally at least, overseen by the Navy Board).

Principal Officers and Commissioners

Tudor and Stuart period
List of Principal Officers and Commissioners 1546-1660 included.
 the Lieutenant of the Admiralty, (He presided over the Navy Board from 1546-1564 until he was superseded by the Treasurer. 
 the Treasurer of the Navy originally called Treasurer of Marine Causes he was Senior Commissioner of the board from 1564-1660
 the Surveyor of the Navy, originally called Surveyor and Rigger of the Navy (1546-1660)
 the Clerk of the Navy, originally called Clerk of the Kings Ships (1546-1660)
 the Surveyor of Marine Victuals (1550-1679) (against protocol he was added under monarchs, Elizabeth I, James I and Charles I).
 the Comptroller of the Navy, originally called the Clerk Comptroller of the Navy was in charge of Naval spending he also acted as Chairman of the Board from 1660.  
 the Keeper of the Storehouses, also called Clerk of the Storehouses he was briefly a member in (1546–1560) his duties were later merged with the treasurers.
 the Master of Naval Ordnance, specifically assigned officer from the Ordnance Board was briefly a member from (1546–1589).
Instrumental in the early administration of the Navy Office were between four and seven "Principal Officers" though some were styled differently prior to 1660. Charles I added a fifth between 1625 and 1640 they included:. 
As defined by a set of Ordinances drawn up under Henry VIII's successor, Edward VI, the Navy Board was given a high degree of autonomy, yet remained subordinate to the Lord High Admiral until 1628. This – at times ambiguous – relationship with The Admiralty was an enduring characteristic of the board, and was one of the reasons behind its eventual demise in 1832.

Commonwealth and Restoration period
During the Commonwealth the business of both Navy Board and Admiralty was carried out by a committee of Parliament. Following the Restoration, James, Duke of York (as Lord High Admiral) oversaw the reconstitution of the Navy Board. Alongside the aforementioned "Principal Officers" further officials were appointed to serve as "Commissioners" of the Navy, and together these constituted the board. By tradition, commissioners were always Navy officers of the rank of post-captain or captain who had retired from active service at sea.List of Principal Officers and Commissioners 1660-1796 included. Comptroller of the Navy (chaired meetings of the board and liaised with the First Lord of the Admiralty)
 Surveyor of the Navy
 Treasurer of the Navy
 Clerk of the Acts of the NavyAdditional Commissioners added after 1666, who were soon given specific duties (so as to lessen the administrative burden placed on the Controller. Controller of Treasurer Accounts, (1667–1796)
 Controller of Victualling Accounts, (1667–1796)
 Controller of Storekeepers Accounts, (1671–1796)
 Commissioners for Old Accounts, (1686–1688)
 Commissioners for Current Business, (1686–1688)
 Commissioners for Examining Accounts (Incurred), (1688–1689)
 Deputy Comptroller of the Navy, (1793–1813)

Hanoverian period
In 1796 the board was reconstituted: the post of Clerk of the Acts was abolished, as were the three controllers of accounts. Henceforward, the board would consist of the controller and a deputy controller (both of whom were normally commissioned officers), the surveyor (usually a master shipwright from one of the dockyards) and around seven other commissioners (a mixture of officers and civilians) to whom no specific duties were attached.

The treasurer, though still technically a member of the board, was (like the dockyard commissioners) seldom in attendance. In fact the post of treasurer was by this stage little more than a sinecure; the main work of his department was carried out by its senior clerk, the Paymaster of the Navy.

Following the abolition of the office of Clerk of the Acts, the post of secretary to the board was created; as well as overseeing the administrative department, the secretary attended meetings of the board and took minutes; but he was not himself a commissioner and did not therefore have a vote.List of Principal Officers and Commissioners 1796-1832 included: Comptroller of the Navy
 Surveyor of the Navy
 Treasurer of the Navy
 Deputy Surveyor of the Navy
 Pay Commissioner, (1796–1814).
 Inspector-General of Naval Works, (1807–1808), from 1796 to 1807 post holder reported to the Board of Admiralty''
 Civil Architect and Engineer of the Navy, (1808–1812)
 Surveyor of Buildings, (1812–1832)
 Surveyor of Dockyards, (1813–1832).
 Accountant-General of the Navy, (1829–32)
 Storekeeper General of the Navy, (1829–32)
 Deputy Comptroller of the Navy, (1829–1832)
 Superintendent of Transport, (1829–1831)

Commissioners of the Navy
To all of these lists must be added the Commissioners of the Navy with oversight of the Royal Navy Dockyards. Normally resident at their respective dockyards and thus known as resident commissioners, these commissioners did not normally attend the board's meetings in London; nevertheless, they were considered full members of the Navy Board and carried the full authority of the board when implementing or making decisions within their respective yards both at home and overseas. Not every Dockyard had a resident commissioner in charge, but the larger Yards, both at home and overseas, generally did (with the exception of the nearby Thames-side yards of Deptford and Woolwich, which were for the most part overseen directly by the board in London, although Woolwich did have a Resident Commissioner for some years). Chatham Dockyard, Devonport Dockyard, Portsmouth Dockyard, Sheerness Dockyard, Trincomalee Dockyard and the Bermuda Dockyard all had Resident Commissioners.

After the abolition of the board in 1832 the duties of these commissioners were taken over by commissioned officers: usually an admiral-superintendent at the largest yards, or a captain-superintendent at smaller yards.

Headquarters

From the 1650s the board, together with its staff of around 60 clerks, was accommodated in a large house at the corner of Crutched Friars and Seething Lane, just north of the Tower of London. Following a fire, the house was rebuilt by Sir Christopher Wren. This new Navy Office provided accommodation for the commissioners, as well as office space. Different departments were accommodated in different parts of the building; the rear wing (which had its own entrance on Tower Hill) housed the offices of the Sick and Hurt Board. The Victualling Office was also located nearby, on Little Tower Hill, close to its early manufacturing base at Eastminster. The Navy Treasury, where the treasurer was based, was located from 1664 in Broad Street (having moved there from Leadenhall Street). It was also known as the Navy Pay Office. In 1789, all these offices were relocated into the new purpose-built office complex of Somerset House.

Demise
By the early nineteenth century, members of Parliament had begun raising concerns at the cost of Navy Board operations and the obscurity of its record-keeping. On 15 February 1828 Robert Peel, the Home Secretary, established a Parliamentary Committee to review the board's operations. The committee, chaired by Irish MP Henry Parnell, was specifically charged with interpreting and reducing Navy Board costs. By the end of the year it had issued critical reports covering the board's administration of naval pensions, half-pay, revenue, expenditure and debt. In particular, the committee noted the Navy Board had long since abandoned financial controls; that it had instead "established a scale of expense greatly beyond what existed during former periods of peace," and that its operations tended to "exalt its own importance" over the needs of the public service as a whole.

The board's internal operations were also found wanting:

The Government's response was delivered on 14 February 1832, with a Bill to abolish both the Navy Board and the Victualling Board and merge their functions into the Board of Admiralty. This Bill was moved by Sir James Graham as First Lord of the Admiralty, who argued that the Boards had been "constituted at a period when the principles of banking were unknown," and were redundant in an era of greater Parliamentary oversight and regulation. An amendment proposed by First Sea Lord Sir George Cockburn suggested that Navy Board be preserved and only the Victualling Board abolished, but this was defeated by 118 votes to 50. The Bill itself was passed on 23 May 1832, with the Navy Board formally ceasing operations from 1 June.

Notes

References

Sources
  Rodger, N.A.M. (1979). The Admiralty. Offices of State. Terence Dalton Ltd, Lavenham. Suffolk. England.

External links
 
 

Boards of the Royal Navy
1546 establishments in England
1832 disestablishments in the United Kingdom
Navy Office organisations